Prabuddha Banerjee is an Indian music director and film composer. He collaborated with some well known directors like Kaushik Ganguly, Suman Mukhopadhyay, Indranil Roychowdhury and Bratya Basu.

Filmography

Awards 

 National Film Award for Best Music Direction for Jyeshthoputro

References

External links
 

Living people
Music directors
Indian film score composers
Musicians from Kolkata
Year of birth missing (living people)